Carbon stains are a skin condition characterized by a discoloration of the skin from embedded carbon, usually occurring due to accidents with firearms or firecrackers, or from a puncture wound by a pencil, which may leave a permanent black mark of embedded graphite, easily mistaken for metastatic melanoma.

See also 
 Soot tattoo
 List of cutaneous conditions

References 

Skin conditions resulting from physical factors